Events in the year 2023 in Senegal.

Incumbents 
 President: Macky Sall (since 2012)

Events 
Ongoing – COVID-19 pandemic in Senegal

January 
 8 January - Kaffrine bus crash
 16 January - Nineteen people are killed and 24 others injured by a bus–truck collision in Sakal Arrondissement.

References 

 
Senegal
Senegal
2020s in Senegal
Years of the 21st century in Senegal